The Clausura 2010 season (officially known as Torneo Clausura  2010) was the 24th edition of the Primera División de Fútbol Profesional since its establishment of an Apertura and Clausura format. Isidro Metapán won the tournament, claiming their fourth title in history. The season began on January 9, 2010 and concluded on May 23, 2010. FAS were the defending champions, having won the Apertura 2009 and clinching the first of two salvadoran spots for the 2010–11 CONCACAF Champions League. Isidro Metapán clinched the other spot. Like previous years, the league consisted of 10 teams, each playing a home and away game against the other clubs for a total of 18 games, respectively. The top four teams by the end of the regular season took part of the playoffs.

Municipal Limeño was tied for penultimate club for the 2009–2010 season.  They had a 1-game playoff to determine who the penultimate club would be. Limeño lost that match, designating it as the penultimate club of the 2009–2010 season, and thus, having to partake in a relegation playoff against the 2nd division runner-up. Limeño would lose this playoff and thus get relegated to the 2nd division for the 2010–2011 season.

Team information

Stadia and locations

Team information

Personnel and sponsoring

Managerial changes

Before the start of the season

Regular season

League table

Results

Playoffs

Semi-finals

First leg

Second leg

Final

Top scorers

 Updated to games played on April 25, 2010. 
 Post-season goals are not included, only regular season goals.

Aggregate table

List of foreign players in the league
This is a list of foreign players in Clausura 2010. The following players:
 have played at least one apetura game for the respective club.
 have not been capped for the El Salvador national football team on any level, independently from the birthplace

A new rule was introduced this season that clubs can only have three foreign players per club and can only add a new player if there is an injury or player/s is released.

C.D. Águila
  Hermes Martínez
  Arturo Albarrán
  Nicolás Muñoz 
  Edgar Añazco
  Maxwell Ferreira

Alianza F.C.
  José Oliveira de Souza
  Mario Muñoz
  Edgar Ramos

Atlético Marte
  José Luis Osorio
  Wilson Sánchez
  Juliano De Carvalho

Atlético Balboa
  Alcides Bandera
  Javier Rabbia
  Luis Torres

C.D. FAS
  Roberto Peña
  Alejandro Bentos
  Jeyson Vega
 (player released mid season)

C.D. Luis Ángel Firpo
  Mario Benítez
  Fernando Leguizamón
  Juliano de Andrade

A.D. Isidro Metapán
  Gabriel Garcete
  Ernesto Aquino
  Paolo Suárez

Alacranes Del Norte 
  Luis Espindola
  Enar Bolaños
  Franklin Webster

Municipal Limeño
  Cristian Mosquera
  Garrick Gordon 
  Marvin Sánchez
  Wilmer Ramos
  Richard Camaña

Vista Hermosa
  John Castillo
  Leonardo Da Silva
  Rolando Rojas
  Israel Garcia

See also
 List of football clubs in El Salvador
 List of Salvadoran football champions

Notes

References

External links
 El Grafico League Coverage 
 FIFA League Info

Primera División de Fútbol Profesional Clausura seasons
El
1